Jannik Dehm (born 2 May 1996) is a German professional footballer who plays as a right-back for Hannover 96.

References

External links
 
 

1996 births
Living people
People from Bruchsal
Sportspeople from Karlsruhe (region)
Footballers from Baden-Württemberg
German footballers
Germany youth international footballers
Association football fullbacks
Association football midfielders
Karlsruher SC II players
Karlsruher SC players
TSG 1899 Hoffenheim II players
Holstein Kiel players
Hannover 96 players
2. Bundesliga players
Regionalliga players